Zheng Bo (born 26 November 1983) is a badminton player from Hunan, China.

Career 
A doubles specialist, Zheng won men's doubles at the 2003 Indonesia Open with Sang Yang. Zheng and Sang also secured the winning point against Denmark in the final of the 2004 Thomas Cup, to clinch China's first men's world team title since 1990. Most of his international titles, however, have come in mixed doubles. Zheng won the 2002 French Open with Zhang Yawen and the 2006 Hong Kong Open with Zhao Tingting. His other mixed doubles titles, all in partnership with doubles maestro Gao Ling, include the 2006 Asian Games, the 2007 China Masters, the prestigious All England Open Championships in both 2007 and 2008; and the 2007 Japan, German, Korea, Malaysia, and the 2007, 2008 Indonesia Opens. Zhang and Gao were the silver medalists behind Indonesia's Nova Widianto and Lilyana Natsir at the 2007 BWF World Championships in Kuala Lumpur. They were upset in the round of 16 at the 2008 Beijing Olympics by former World Champions Nathan Robertson and Gail Emms. Associated with Ma Jin, Zheng won the mixed doubles title at the 2010 BWF World Championships.

Achievements

BWF World Championships 
Men's doubles

Mixed doubles

World Cup 
Mixed doubles

Asian Games 
Mixed doubles

World Junior Championships 
Boys' doubles

Mixed doubles

Asian Junior Championships 
Boys' doubles

Mixed doubles

BWF Superseries 
The BWF Superseries, launched on 14 December 2006 and implemented in 2007, is a series of elite badminton tournaments, sanctioned by Badminton World Federation (BWF). BWF Superseries has two level such as Superseries and Superseries Premier. A season of Superseries features twelve tournaments around the world, which introduced since 2011, with successful players invited to the Superseries Finals held at the year end.

Mixed doubles

  BWF Superseries Finals tournament
  BWF Superseries Premier tournament
  BWF Superseries tournament

BWF Grand Prix 
The BWF Grand Prix had two levels, the BWF Grand Prix and Grand Prix Gold. It was a series of badminton tournaments sanctioned by the Badminton World Federation (BWF) which was held from 2007 to 2017. The World Badminton Grand Prix has been sanctioned by the International Badminton Federation from 1983 to 2006.

Men's doubles

Mixed doubles

  BWF Grand Prix Gold tournament
  BWF & IBF Grand Prix tournament

IBF International 
Men's doubles

Mixed doubles

References

External links 
 
 

1983 births
Living people
Badminton players from Hunan
Chinese male badminton players
Badminton players at the 2004 Summer Olympics
Badminton players at the 2008 Summer Olympics
Olympic badminton players of China
Badminton players at the 2006 Asian Games
Asian Games gold medalists for China
Asian Games medalists in badminton
Medalists at the 2006 Asian Games
World No. 1 badminton players